Den första är alltid gratis  (English: The First (One) Is Always Free) is the fifth studio album released by Swedish singer and songwriter Veronica Maggio. The album was released in Sweden on 6 May 2016 through Universal Music AB. The album has peaked at number six in Norway and number one in Sweden.

Singles
 "Den första är alltid gratis" was released as the lead single from the album on 17 March 2016. The song peaked at number 16 on the Swedish Singles Chart.
 "Ayahuasca" was released as the second single from the album on 28 April 2016. The song peaked at number 35 on the Swedish Singles Chart.
 "Vi mot världen" was released as the third single from the album on 2 May 2016. The song peaked at number ten on the Swedish Singles Chart.

Track listing
Credits adapted from iTunes.

Charts

Weekly charts

Year-end charts

Release history

References

Veronica Maggio albums
2016 albums
Universal Music AB albums